The Northern Michigan Wildcats are the athletic teams that represent Northern Michigan University, located in Marquette, Michigan, in NCAA intercollegiate sporting competitions. All teams that play under NCAA governance compete at the Division II level, with three exceptions. The most significant one is the men's ice hockey program, which plays at the Division I level. Two other sports, Nordic skiing (a coeducational sport with separate men's and women's squads) and women's wrestling (part of the NCAA Emerging Sports for Women program), are de facto Division I sports; the NCAA holds a single skiing championship open to members of all three divisions, and does not currently include women's wrestling in its divisional structure. While NMU's skiing program includes both disciplines contested in the NCAA championships (Alpine and Nordic), only the Nordic program competes within the NCAA structure.

NMU fields three other recognized varsity teams, two of which serve as official U.S. Olympic training centers in non-NCAA sports or disciplines. The Olympic training centers are in weightlifting for both men and women, and the non-NCAA discipline of men's Greco-Roman wrestling. The other recognized varsity team is in esports, which are not governed by the NCAA.

The Wildcats compete as members of the North Division of the Great Lakes Intercollegiate Athletic Conference for 14 of 20 varsity sports, with the men's hockey team playing in the Central Collegiate Hockey Association, and the skiing team competes in the Central Collegiate Ski Association. NMU has been a member of the GLIAC since 1987.

Northern Michigan's rivals in sports action are the two other major schools in the upper peninsula: Michigan Technological University, and Lake Superior State University. The winner of the annual football game between NMU and Michigan Tech is awarded the Miner's Cup.

Varsity teams

List of teams

National championships
National Championships (4):
 1975 – Football – NCAA Division II
 1991 – Men's Ice Hockey – NCAA Division I
 1993 – Women's Volleyball – NCAA Division II
 1994 – Women's Volleyball – NCAA Division II

National Runners-up (4):
 1980 – Men's Ice Hockey – NCAA Division I
 1992 – Women's Swimming and Diving – NCAA Division II
 1992 – Women's Volleyball – NCAA Division II
 1995 – Women's Volleyball – NCAA Division II

Basketball Final Four (1):
 1961 – Men's Basketball – NAIA Division I

Facilities
The Division II football team plays in the world's largest wooden dome, the Superior Dome.

OTS

The United States Olympic Training Site on the campus of Northern Michigan University is one of 16 Olympic training sites in the country.  The NMU-OTS provides secondary and post-secondary educational opportunities for athletes while offering training.

With more than 70 resident athletes and coaches, the NMU-OTS is the second-largest Olympic training center in the United States, in terms of residents, behind Colorado Springs.  The USOEC has more residential athletes than the Lake Placid and Chula Vista sites combined.  Over the years, it has grown into a major contributor to the U.S. Olympic movement.

Current resident training programs include Greco-Roman wrestling and weightlifting.  Athletes must be approved by the NMU-OTS, their national governing body and NMU to be admitted into the program.

NMU-OTS athletes attend NMU while training in their respective sports.  The student athletes receive free or reduced room and board, access to world-class training facilities as well as sports medicine and sports science services, academic tutoring, and a waiver of out-of-state tuition fees by NMU. Although athletes are responsible for tuition at the in-state rate, they may receive the B.J. Stupak Scholarship to help cover expenses.

On-campus NMU-OTS athletes live in  NMU's  Meyland Hall, eat in campus dining halls, and train at the university's Superior Dome.

The NMU-OTS also offers a variety of short-term training camps; regional, national, and international competitions; coaches and officials education clinics; and an educational program for retired Olympians.

Alumni
Lloyd Carr, former head coach at the University of Michigan  
Jerry Glanville, former NFL coach
Mark Maddox, former NFL player for the Buffalo Bills and Arizona Cardinals
Damian Matacz, professional basketball player
Steve Mariucci, former head coach of the Detroit Lions and San Francisco 49ers
Robert Saleh, Head Coach of the New York Jets played football for NMU.
Len St. Jean, former NFL player for the Boston/New England Patriots
Tom Izzo, Michigan State coach played basketball at NMU
Steve Avery, former NFL player for the Houston Oilers, Green Bay Packers and Pittsburgh Steelers

References